Maurizio Benenato (born 25 March 1991) is an Italian ballroom and Latin dancer and choreographer.

Early life 
Benenato began dancing at the age of five, specialising in both ballroom and Latin disciplines.

Career 

From February 2012 to March 2015, Benenato partnered Russian dancer, Tatiana Veselkina to great success. Together the couple were World 10 Dance Cup and European 10 Dance Cup Champions. In 2016 partnered with Russian dancer, Veronika Dichka. Their best placement came when they placed second at the WDSF Open in Moscow.

Following his competitive career, he joined the cast of the Riverdance show, Heartbeat of Home as a principal dancer and also danced with the Burn the Floor touring show.

In 2020, Benenato joined Strictly Come Dancing professional, Graziano Di Prima’s, Havana Nights UK touring show.

Dancing with the Stars 
On 22 December 2021, Benenato was announced as one of the new professionals to join the fifth season of the Irish version of Dancing with the Stars. He was partnered with author Cathy Kelly. They were the first couple to be eliminated from the series.

Benenato returned for the sixth season in 2023. He was partnered with Eurovision singer Brooke Scullion. However on 22 January, ahead of the third live show, Benenato announced his departure from the series stating personal reasons.

Series 5 – with celebrity partner Cathy Kelly

Series 6 – with celebrity partner Brooke Scullion

References 

1991 births
Living people
Ballroom dancers